William John Martini (born February 10, 1947 in Passaic, New Jersey) is a senior United States district judge of the United States District Court for the District of New Jersey, having been in active service from November 14, 2002, to February 10, 2015. Martini is one of twenty-four judges seated on the New Jersey District Court, and his highest profile case to date was the corruption trial for former Newark Mayor Sharpe James.

Before his judicial service, Martini was a Republican Party politician who represented New Jersey's 8th congressional district in the House of Representatives, where he served from January 3, 1995 – January 3, 1997.

Early life and career
Martini graduated from Passaic High School. He received a Bachelor of Arts degree from Villanova University in Philadelphia, and received his Juris Doctor from Rutgers School of Law—Newark in 1972.

Martini started his career as an assistant in the Hudson County prosecutor's office in 1973. The following year, he was named an Assistant United States Attorney in the U.S. Attorney's Office for the District of New Jersey, and served in that post until 1977. He went into private practice after that.

Martini would eventually land in Passaic County again, and won election to the city council in Clifton, New Jersey in 1990. He would add a position on the Passaic County Board of Chosen Freeholders in 1992.

In 1994, the Republican Party nominated Martini for Congress in New Jersey's 8th congressional district. He faced off against one-term incumbent Herbert Klein, who had fallen out of favor with the voters. Riding that, plus the wave of the 1994 Republican Revolution's disillusion with the Democratic Party, Martini defeated Klein and took one of the 54 seats in the House of Representatives the Republicans gained that year. In addition, he was the first Republican to win an election in the district since Gordon Canfield won his last re-election bid in 1958.

Martini was defeated for re-election in 1996 by Paterson mayor Bill Pascrell, and was one of eight Republican Representatives elected in the 1994 Republican Revolution to be defeated in their re-election bids. He has not run for political office since then.

In 1999, the Governor of New Jersey Christine Todd Whitman named Martini to the Board of Commissioners of the Port Authority of New York and New Jersey, a post in which he served for three years.

On January 23, 2002, Martini was nominated for a judgeship of the United States District Court of New Jersey by President George W. Bush, was confirmed on November 14, 2002 and received his commission on November 19, 2002. Martini was one of nine judges appointed by President Bush to the District Court of New Jersey and was the first to be seated. He assumed senior status on February 10, 2015.

The Sharpe James case

Martini sentenced Sharpe James, former mayor of Newark, to 27 months in prison for corruption. State and federal prosecutors wanted the maximum allowable sentence of 15 to 20 years although federal guidelines would only allow a 5 to 12 year potential sentence. Martini said that James' years as a public servant played a role in his decision, but would not discuss the case further. U.S. Attorney Chris Christie announced that he would appeal Martini's sentence.

Hassan v. City of New York
In February 2014, Martini dismissed a federal lawsuit brought by eight New Jersey Muslims alleging they were unlawfully targeted for surveillance by the New York Police Department because of their religion.
The suit accused the NYPD of spying on Muslims in mosques, restaurants and schools.
In his decision. Martini wrote "The more likely explanation for the surveillance was to locate budding terrorist conspiracies."

Baher Azmy, Legal Director at the Center for Constitutional Rights (which served as co-counsel in the case) responded to Judge Martini's ruling: "In addition to willfully ignoring the harm that our innocent clients suffered from the NYPD's illegal spying program, by upholding the NYPD's blunderbuss Muslim surveillance practices, the court's decision gives legal sanction to the targeted discrimination of Muslims anywhere and everywhere in this country, without limitation, for no other reason than their religion." 
 The plaintiffs appealed the dismissal of their case, and numerous organizations filed amicus curiae briefs. The Court of Appeals reversed Martini's decision and remanded the case in October 2015. It was eventually settled in April 2018.

Electoral history

References

External links

Department of Justice resume

Confirmation hearings on federal appointments : hearings before the Committee on the Judiciary, United States Senate, One Hundred Seventh Congress, first session. pt.5 (2002) 

1947 births
Living people
County commissioners in New Jersey
New Jersey lawyers
Passaic High School alumni
Politicians from Passaic, New Jersey
Rutgers School of Law–Newark alumni
Rutgers University alumni
Villanova University alumni
American people of Italian descent
Judges of the United States District Court for the District of New Jersey
United States district court judges appointed by George W. Bush
21st-century American judges
New Jersey city council members
Republican Party members of the United States House of Representatives from New Jersey
Assistant United States Attorneys